Stobswell is an area of Dundee, Scotland with a population of approximately 10,000. It was originally a small hamlet outside the city until the industrial revolution caused the growth of Dundee. The area is by and large a residential area. Schools in the area are Morgan Academy Secondary School, Glebelands Primary School and Clepington Primary School. The area is home to the Dundee International Sports Centre (D.I.S.C.).

History
The area developed around a well which serviced the nearby farmhouses of Janefield and Maryfield. Housing was developed in the area by the city's "jute barons" in the 19th century to accommodate workers in the textile mills in the area and the city. In 1856, the East Dundee Poorhouse was built on a two-acre (8,000 m²) site in the area. After the inception of the National Health Service, the poorhouse was renamed The Rowans and later became a hospital and care-home for the elderly. The building now known as Morgan Academy opened in 1868 as Morgan Hospital, a charitable institution providing accommodation and education for "sons of tradesmen and persons of the working class whose parents stand in the need of assistance". The present Stobswell Church (itself a union of four local churches) was built in 1874. It is the local Church of Scotland parish church.

Education
Schools in the area are Morgan Academy, Glebelands Primary School and Clepington Primary School. The Melrose Campus of Dundee College was also located in the area.

Sports and recreation
The area is home to the Dundee International Sports Centre (D.I.S.C.), which staged the European Hockey Championships in 1998. The local Rugby club is Stobswell R.F.C. and play at the McTaggart Sports Centre, Old Glamis Road.

The local community also run a number of events. The longest-established is the annual Celebration in the Park, which brings thousands to Baxter Park in August. It also includes a winter Doggyfest, the week-long Stobfest in May, and an annual motor show held by Dundee Museum of Transport.

Notable residents
 In the summer of 1812, Mary Shelley lived in the area with William Baxter, an acquaintance of her family. She developed a friendship with Baxter's two daughters Christina and Isabel. The dunes, beach, and barren hills near Dundee inspired Mary, and she would describe this scenery in her novella Mathilda (written in 1819-1820).

"Mary Shelley did not spend time with the William (Edward) Baxter cited here as he was not born until 1825.   The William Baxter she visited may have been his grandfather and father of Edward Baxter who was the father of William Edward Baxter (1825-1890)."
 Doug Cowie Scottish International football player. Dundee F.C. and Scotland 
 Former Leeds United and Scotland football player, Peter Lorimer scored 176 goals in one season for Stobswell School.
 Billy Mackenzie singer with The Associates

References

External links
Stobswell.org.uk – Stobswell Forum's website
https://www.instagram.com/stobswellforum/ - Stobswell Forum's Instagram
https://twitter.com/StobswellForum - Stobswell Forum's Twitter account

Areas of Dundee